Cyrtogonone is a genus of shrubs or trees of the spurge family (Euphorbiaceae), first described as a genus in 1911. It contains only one known species, Cyrtogonone argentea, native to tropical central Africa (Nigeria, Cameroon, Gabon, Equatorial Guinea). It is dioecious.

References

Aleuritideae
Monotypic Euphorbiaceae genera
Flora of West-Central Tropical Africa
Flora of Nigeria
Dioecious plants